George Burdette Corbett (June 14, 1908October 11, 1990) was a professional American football player who played running back for seven seasons for the Chicago Bears. He was born in Dix, Illinois but later moved to Arthur, Illinois and graduated at what is now known as Arthur-Lovington High School.

External links 
 

1908 births
1990 deaths
People from Arthur, Illinois
People from Jefferson County, Illinois
Players of American football from Illinois
American football running backs
Chicago Bears players